Lukash is a gender-neutral Slavic surname. Notable people with the surname include:

Mykola Lukash (1919–1988), Ukrainian literary translator, theorist, and lexicographer
Nikolai Lukash (1796–1868), Russian general and politician
Olena Lukash (born 1976), Ukrainian jurist and politician